Veronica sublobata, commonly known as the false ivy-leaved speedwell, is a species of flowering plant in the genus Veronica. It is native to Europe. It has naturalized in the United States.

References

sublobata
Flora of Europe